The Firehouse Five Plus Two was a Dixieland jazz band, popular in the 1950s, consisting of members of the Disney animation department. Leader and trombonist Ward Kimball was inspired to form the band after spending time with members of the Disney animation and sound department and finding that they had a lot in common as jazz aficionados. The lunchtime chats escalated into a full on lunchtime jam session as Kimball, an amateur trombonist, and animator Frank Thomas, a pianist, would find they "sounded pretty good all by ourselves." The band went by two names, the Huggajeedy Eight and the San Gabriel Valley Blue Blowers. The "Firehouse" motif came from a 1916 American LaFrance fire engine that Kimball restored for the local Horseless Carriage Club, and the "Plus Two" was from the fact the band had seven people.

The band was also formative in creating the Good Time Jazz label under fellow aficionado Lester Koenig, who managed all the band's releases from 1940's The Firehouse Five Plus Two Story, Volume 1 to 1970's Live at Earthquake McGoon's. Walt Disney was approving of the band, letting them play at the company's Christmas parties, at Disneyland, and other social functions, on the single condition that they never fully leave their jobs at the studio.

Members
The formative members of the band, as listed in the liner notes for The Firehouse Five Plus Two Story.
 Danny Alguire — Cornet, fingerprint expert formerly with L.A. police department, assistant director at Disney.
 Harper Goff — Banjo, illustrator at Warner Brothers and Colliers Magazine, Disney designer and Imagineer.
 Ward Kimball — Trombone, siren, tambourine, sound effects, leader, lead animator and director for Walt Disney Animation and Disney Studios.
 Clarke Mallery — Clarinet, animator for Superman and Aquaman cartoons of the 1960s.
 Monte Mountjoy — Drums, formerly with Bob Wills.
 Erdman (Ed) Penner — Soprano saxophone, bass saxophone on early recordings, later switched to tuba, story writer, died in 1956.
 Frank Thomas — Piano, lead animator for Walt Disney Animation.

Later, other Disney artists and professional jazz musicians joined in:
George Bruns - Tuba and trombone, substituting for Kimball, composer for many Disney animated and live action films.
 Eddie Forrest - Drummer for the Disney Studios Orchestra and the Hollywood Bowl Orchestra.
 Don Kinch - Tuba, substituting for Ed Penner following his death. 
Jimmy MacDonald - Drums, foley artist and head of sound department.
George Probert - Clarinet, and soprano sax, former assistant director at Disney.
Dick Roberts - Banjo, leader of the Banjo Kings.

Timeline

Discography 
In addition to many singles, the band recorded at least thirteen LP records, starting in 1949. The last album, Live at Earthquake McGoon's, was recorded in 1970 in San Francisco. They have subsequently been re-released on CD and remain available.
 The Firehouse Five Plus Two Story*, Part One (1951)
 The Firehouse Five Plus Two Story*, Part Two (1951)
 The Firehouse Five Plus Two Story*, Part Three (1952)
 The Firehouse Five Plus Two Story*, Part Four (1952)
 The Firehouse Five Plus Two Plays for Lovers (1956)
 The Firehouse Five Plus Two, Volume Five: Goes South! (1956)
 The Firehouse Five Plus Two Goes To Sea (1957)
 The Firehouse Five Plus Two Dixieland Favorites (1960)
 The Firehouse Five Plus Two Crashes a Party (1960)
 The Firehouse Five Plus Two Around the World (1961)
 The Firehouse Five Plus Two At Disneyland (1962)
 The Firehouse Five Plus Two Goes To a Fire (1964)
 The Firehouse Five Plus Two Twenty Years Later (1970)
 The Firehouse Five Plus Two Live at Earthquake McGoon's (1970)
(* also released as a 4-record album)

In popular culture 
In early Pogo comic strips, former Disney animator Walt Kelly featured a band called "The Firehouse Five Glee and Pilau Society".  One 1950 Sunday strip featured a caricature of Ward Kimball as "Kimbo Cat".

In 1977, comedian Ray Stevens recorded a "chicken clucking" version of Glenn Miller's "In the Mood" under the name "Henhouse Five Plus Too".

Televised/film appearances 
The band appeared in several Disney television specials, including their first special in 1950, One Hour In Wonderland. They also appeared on the early Mickey Mouse Club television shows and appeared in animated form in the 1953 Goofy animated short, "How to Dance".

The band also received an homage in the direct-to-video 1999 Disney movie Mickey's Once Upon a Christmas, where a band composed of actual firefighters played a jazzy rendition of "Jingle Bells" to help with a toy drive along with Mickey in "The Gift of the Magi" segment.

The band received an homage in the ending of the 2009 Disney film The Princess and the Frog, with the jazz-playing alligator Louis now belonging to a group called "The Firefly Five Plus Lou".

Besides appearing in Disney productions, the band also appeared with Teresa Brewer in the 1951 Universal short "Teresa Brewer and the Firehouse Five Plus Two" and appeared as themselves in the 1951 Kathryn Grayson film, Grounds for Marriage. The Firehouse Five Plus Two also appeared on A Merry Christmas with Bing Crosby and the Andrews Sisters on February 22, 1950, sponsored by Chesterfield cigarettes.

References

External links
 
 

Dixieland ensembles
Dixieland revival ensembles
American jazz ensembles
Disney people
Good Time Jazz Records artists